The 1902 Arkansas gubernatorial election was held on September 1, 1902.

Incumbent Democratic Governor Jeff Davis defeated Republican nominee Harry H. Myers and Independent Republican nominee Charles D. Greaves with 64.60% of the vote.

General election

Candidates
Jeff Davis, Democratic, incumbent Governor
Harry H. Myers, "regular" Republican, attorney, Republican nominee for Arkansas's 6th congressional district in 1894
Charles D. Greaves, "insurgent" Republican, Republican nominee for Arkansas's 2nd congressional district in 1896
George H. Kimball, Prohibition. Kimball was endorsed by the state Populist party.

Results

References

1902
Arkansas
Gubernatorial